The 2010 ATS F3 Cup was the eighth edition of the German F3 Cup. The season consisted of nine race weekends, totalling eighteen races, beginning on 10 April at Oschersleben and ending on 3 October at the same venue.

HS Technik driver Tom Dillmann became the first French driver to win the championship title after a title battle with Van Amersfoort Racing's Daniel Abt. Dillmann, who won six races during the season had held a seven-point championship lead into the final race over Abt, who won the opening race at Oschersleben to go with his other win at Assen, which meant that Abt had to finish in the top two placings to have a mathematical chance of overhauling Dillmann, but a broken lambda sensor eliminated Abt from challenging Dillmann. Also resolved at the final round was the battle for third place between Motopark Academy rookie and three-time race winner Kevin Magnussen and Abt's Van Amersfoort team-mate Stef Dusseldorp, who won races at Oschersleben and Assen. Magnussen had led Dusseldorp by two points with one race to run, but Dusseldorp lost the opportunity for third place after failing to start the final race; he stalled at the first start and was rammed from behind by Magnussen's team-mate Jimmy Eriksson and accident damage prevented from restarting. Despite finishing behind Abt in the overall championship, Magnussen's consistent finishing won him the rookie championship.

Felix Rosenqvist finished best of the rest for Performance Racing, winning two races at Assen along with six second-place finishes for a fifth place championship finish. Eriksson at EuroSpeedway Lausitz, the third Van Amersfoort car of Willi Steindl in the final Oschersleben race and Brandl Racing's Nico Monien in a one-off appearance at Hockenheim also won races during the season. In the secondary Trophy class, twelve class wins in sixteen races enabled Riccardo Brutschin to take a dominant championship win, as he finished 21 points clear of Aleksey Karachev, who took his only class win at the final race of the season in which Brutschin was absent as he competed in the Cup class. Aki Sandberg also won at Oschersleben as he finished third in class. Aleksi Tuukkanen and Daniel Aho both took two victories in part-seasons, while Formula Renault 3.5 Series champion Mikhail Aleshin made a guest appearance in the class at Oschersleben, taking two on-the-road victories but was ineligible for championship points.

Teams and drivers
 Guest drivers are listed in italics.

Calendar
Championship was part of the ADAC Masters Weekend at the seven rounds with Nürburgring round in July supporting ADAC Truck Grand Prix and Assen round in August as part of the Rizla Racing Day. With the exception of two rounds at TT Circuit Assen, all rounds took place on German soil.

Standings

Cup
Points were awarded as follows:

Trophy
Points were awarded as follows:

{|
|valign="top"|

† — Drivers did not finish the race, but were classified as they completed over 90% of the race distance.

SONAX Rookie-Pokal
Points were awarded as follows:

† — Drivers did not finish the race, but were classified as they completed over 90% of the race distance.

See also
 2010 Formula 3 Euro Series season
 2010 Masters of Formula 3

References

External links
 

German Formula Three Championship seasons
German Formula Three
German
German Formula 3 Championship